Robert Mark Goresky is a Canadian mathematician who invented intersection homology with his advisor and life partner Robert MacPherson.

Career
Goresky received his Ph.D. from Brown University in 1976.  His thesis, titled Geometric Cohomology and Homology of Stratified Objects, was written under the direction of MacPherson. Many of the results in his thesis were published in 1981 by the American Mathematical Society. He has taught at the University of British Columbia in Vancouver, and Northeastern University.

Awards
Goresky received a Sloan Research Fellowship in 1981. He received the Coxeter–James Prize in 1984. In 2002, Goresky and MacPherson were jointly awarded the Leroy P. Steele Prize for Seminal Contribution to Research by the American Mathematical Society.
In 2012 Goresky became a fellow of the American Mathematical Society.

Personal 
Goresky's PhD advisor, Robert D. MacPherson, later became his life partner. Their discovery of intersection homology made "both of them famous." After the collapse of the Soviet Union, they were instrumental in channeling aid to Russian mathematicians, especially many who had to hide their sexuality.

Selected publications
 Goresky, Mark; MacPherson, Robert, La dualité de Poincaré pour les espaces singuliers, C. R. Acad. Sci. Paris Sér. A-B 284 (1977), no. 24, A1549–A1551.  
 Goresky, Mark; MacPherson, Robert,  Intersection homology theory, Topology 19 (1980), no. 2, 135–162.  
 Goresky, Mark, Whitney stratified chains and cochains, Trans. Amer. Math. Soc. 267 (1981), 175–196.
 Goresky, Mark; MacPherson, Robert, Intersection homology. II, Inventiones Mathematicae 72 (1983), no. 1, 77–129.  
 Goresky, Mark; MacPherson, Robert, ''Stratified Morse Theory, Springer Verlag, N. Y. (1989), Ergebnisse vol. 14.

References

External links
Home page

20th-century American mathematicians
21st-century American mathematicians
Canadian mathematicians
Topologists
Brown University alumni
Fellows of the American Mathematical Society
Living people
1950 births
Northeastern University faculty
Academic staff of the University of British Columbia
Canadian expatriate academics in the United States